Yathumaagi is a 2010 Indian Tamil-language romance film written and directed by S. Balakumar that stars newcomer Sachin and Sunaina in lead roles. The film's score and soundtrack composed by James Vasanthan. The film, produced by Sakthi Sangavi and Mohana Sangavi under the Chola Creations banner, was released on 12 March 2010 to negative reviews.

Plot
Anand (Sachin) is an advertisement photographer. Quite typical to such genre of films, he comes across Annalakshmi (Sunaina), who is conservative in her looks. After a few initial encounters, Annalakshmi develops love for Anand. However, Anand has other plans. The mystery is soon unraveled and is made known that Anand hails from a family of doctors. When everyone thinks that Anand will tie the knot to Annalakshmi, the twist occurs in the form of Anand accepting an arranged marriage. What transpires between the lead couple forms the rest of the story, which ends in an interesting climax.

Cast
 Sachin as Anand
 Sunaina as Annalakshmi
 Riyaz Khan
 Aniruthan
 Azhagan Thamizhmani as Annalakshmi's father
 Ramesh Khanna
 Pandu
 S. S. Kumaran

Reception
The Times of India gave the film two out of five stars and wrote that "The film's thin storyline is not at fault, only it loses out to poor, unimaginative narration". Indiaglitz praised Sachin's and Sunaina's performance. They stated that Sachin "plays his part well". Behindwoods praised Sachin, claiming that he performed well and Sunaina was also praised for her performance and looks.

Soundtrack
The film's soundtrack is composed by James Vasanthan, which features six tracks.

References

External links
 

2010 films
Films set in Chennai
Indian romance films
2010s Tamil-language films
Films scored by James Vasanthan
2010 romance films